Tutow is a municipality in the Vorpommern-Greifswald district, in Mecklenburg-Vorpommern, Germany.

In 1934, the German air force created its first group of Fighter Squadron 152 in Tutow, and built a command center.

In January 1939, the Donau-Zeitung reported about the Kampffliegerschule.

References

Vorpommern-Greifswald